Damschroder Rock is a conspicuous rock outlier,  high, at the end of a snow-covered spur extending westward for  from the central Pecora Escarpment in the Pensacola Mountains. It was mapped by the United States Geological Survey from surveys and from U.S. Navy air photos, 1956–66, and named by the Advisory Committee on Antarctic Names for Gerald H. Damschroder, a construction mechanic at Plateau Station, winter 1966.

References 

Rock formations of Queen Elizabeth Land